The Pallasca Province (from Quechua Pallasqa) is one of 20 provinces of the Ancash Region in Peru.

Geography 
Other mountains are listed below:

Some of the lakes of the district are Challwaqucha, Kinwaqucha, Llamaqucha, Paryaqucha, Pusaqqucha, P'itiqucha, T'uruqucha and  Wayq'uqucha.

Political division
Pallasca is divided into eleven districts, which are:
 Bolognesi 
 Cabana 
  Conchucos 
  Huacaschuque 
 Huandoval 
 Lacabamba 
 Llapo 
 Pallasca 
 Pampas 
 Santa Rosa 
 Tauca

References

Provinces of the Ancash Region